is a Japanese football player for Albirex Niigata from 2023.

Career 

After rising through the Ventforet Kofu youth ranks and attending Nippon Sport Science University, Ota rejoined the club in 2018.

After three years at Kofu, Ota officially transfer to J2 club, Machida Zelvia on 28 December 2020. He leave from the club after two years at Machida.

On 22 December 2022, Ota joined to J1 promoted club, Albirex Niigata for upcoming 2023 season.

Career statistics 

Updated to the end 2022 season.

Club

References

External links

Profile at J. League
Profile at Ventforet Kofu

1996 births
Living people
Association football people from Yamanashi Prefecture
Japanese footballers
J1 League players
J2 League players
Albirex Niigata players
Ventforet Kofu players
FC Machida Zelvia players
Association football forwards